Charles Frederick Kip Winger (born June 21, 1961) is an American bass guitarist and singer, active as a member of the rock band Winger and as a solo artist. He initially gained notability as a member of Alice Cooper's band, contributing bass and vocals to his Constrictor and Raise Your Fist and Yell albums.

Biography

Early days 
Winger was born in Colorado to parents who were both musicians. At age 16, Winger began studying classical music after hearing the works of composers such as Debussy, Ravel, and Stravinsky in ballet class. At that time he sent a demo tape to Alan Parsons, from whom he received a personal reply.

As a teenager, Winger played in a band named Blackwood Creek with his brothers Nate and Paul plus friend Peter Fletcher (formerly in Pigmy Love Circus). Blackwood Creek disbanded in 1980. Kip, his brothers, and Fletcher also played the Denver area bar scene as the band Colorado. Winger's first release was a Rainbow Music Hall live recording of the song "Wizard of the Key" on the KAZY Thunder on the Mountain compilation in 1980 under the band name Winger which was the Colorado band line-up under a different name.

In 1982, he studied with Sam Guarnaccia in Denver then moved to New York City and waited tables while studying composition with Edgar Grana.

Success 
Kip Winger's first commercial break came in 1984, when he co-wrote the song "Bang Bang" for Kix's third album, Midnite Dynamite. During that time he was working closely with the record producer Beau Hill, recording bass and vocals on various records. While Reb Beach was working on Fiona Flanagan's Beyond the Pale record at Atlantic, Winger and Beach were introduced to each other and later began recording demos. In 1985, Winger joined Alice Cooper's band. After making two albums and touring with Cooper, much of the time alongside keyboardist/guitarist Paul Taylor, Winger left in March 1987 to focus on his own band.

Winger returned to New York to work on songs with Reb Beach, and they were soon joined by Paul Taylor and drummer Rod Morgenstein. They initially performed under the name Sahara, but eventually changed their name to Winger, at Alice Cooper's suggestion.

The band Winger released three albums (Winger (1988), In the Heart of the Young (1990), and Pull (1993)) before moving on to solo careers.

Solo career 
Kip Winger then moved to New Mexico to work on his solo career, and study with Richard Hermann at the University of New Mexico.

He worked and recorded three solo records in Santa Fe, New Mexico: This Conversation Seems Like a Dream, Down Incognito and Songs from the Ocean Floor.

In 2002 Winger moved to Nashville, Tennessee and began working on his fourth solo record, From the Moon to the Sun (2008), which he co-produced with Cenk Eroglu.

Reunited Winger 

In September 2006, it was announced that Winger would be reformed, with the Pull era line-up, to record the band's fourth studio album, IV, and to go on tour to support it. During this tour, Winger recorded Winger Live which was released on CD and DVD in 2007. It was also confirmed that an anthology of rare tracks and early recordings, Demo Anthology (2007) would be released, as well as an autographed limited-edition album, Seventeen: The Demos, where only 300 copies were made.

In 2009, Winger recorded their fifth studio album, Karma, which was hailed as their best record. The band toured the US, Europe and South America.

Classical music 
Following the release of From the Moon to the Sun, Winger studied with Michael Kurek and composed a thirty-minute symphonic piece, "Ghosts", written for strings, piano and harp for a ballet commission. The work had its premiere with the Tucson Symphony Orchestra on November 14–15, 2009. Choreographer Christopher Wheeldon created the ballet "Ghosts", which premiered at the San Francisco Ballet on February 9, 2010, with set design by Laura Jellinek, lighting design by M.L. Geiger and costume design by Mark Zappone.

Winger was nominated for an Isadora Duncan Award for Excellence in Music. The ballet was a hit and was brought back for a second season in 2010.

Winger then composed a four-part work entitled C.F. Kip Winger: Conversations with Nijinsky, intended to celebrate the life of ballet dancer and choreographer Vaslav Nijinsky. The album was recorded by the San Francisco Ballet Orchestra and reached the top of the Traditional Classical Chart on the Billboard music charts.

C.F. Kip Winger: Conversations with Nijinsky was nominated in the Best Classical Contemporary Composition category at the 59th Annual Grammy Awards.

Get Jack, A Musical Thriller 
Kip Winger's theatrical composing debut is the musical thriller Get Jack, with book/lyrics by Damien Gray (Atomic the Musical, Animagique, Sing On Tour). The story revolves around the five female victims of Jack the Ripper. Mary Ann Nichols, Annie Chapman, Elizabeth Stride, Catherine Eddowes, and Mary Jane Kelly—known as the "canonical five"—who rise from the dead to track down Jack and take revenge.

Get Jack is currently on development stage, with director Kelly Devine and musical director Andy Peterson, and was presented in concert in October 2019 in New York.

Winger and Gray released the rock/orchestral Get Jack concept album in July 2019, which entered at #7 on Billboards Cast Albums chart.

Miscellaneous 
Winger's composition "Blue Suede Shoes" from the album IV honored the service and sacrifice of United States armed forces and their families. In appreciation, General Harold Cross presented Winger with an honorary plaque and historic United States of America flag. The presentation occurred in a surprise ceremony during the taping of the PBS television program Legends & Lyrics.

On the television program Beavis and Butt-Head, one of the recurring characters, Stewart Stevenson, wears a Winger T-shirt in contrast to the AC/DC and Metallica shirts worn by Beavis and Butt-Head.

He has participated and performed as head counselor in the Rock 'n' Roll Fantasy Camp with other musicians including Roger Daltrey, Steven Tyler, Todd Rundgren, Jack Blades, Kelly Keagy, Bruce Kulick, Bill Leverty, Steve Lukather, Duff McKagan, Mark Slaughter, Carmine Appice, and Rudy Sarzo. He was featured in an episode of the American TV show Pawn Stars in May 2013 as helping the host, Rick Harrison, through Rock Fantasy Camp.

In the early 1990s, the Jackson Guitar Company made a Kip Winger Signature Bass.

Personal life 
During the late 1980s, Winger was in a relationship with New Zealand supermodel Rachel Hunter who married musician Rod Stewart soon after her breakup with Winger.

Winger married Beatrice Richter in 1991. In November 1996 she was killed in an automobile accident.

He subsequently married Paula DeTullio in July 2004. The couple divorced in 2019.

Discography

Studio albums 
This Conversation Seems Like a Dream (1997)
Down Incognito (1999)
Songs from the Ocean Floor (2001)
From the Moon to the Sun (2008)
Ghosts – Suite No. 1 (2010)
Conversations with Nijinsky (2016)

Soundtrack albums 
Get Jack with Damien Gray (2019)

Box sets 
Solo Box Set Collection (2018)

with Winger 
Winger (1988)
In the Heart of the Young (1990)
Pull (1993)
IV (2006)
Karma (2009)
Better Days Comin' (2014)

with Alice Cooper 
Constrictor (1986)
Raise Your Fist and Yell (1987)
 Trash (1989)
 Welcome 2 My Nightmare (2011)

with Fiona 
Heart Like a Gun (1989)

with The Mob 
The Mob (2005)

with Blackwood Creek 
Blackwood Creek (2009)

Other contributions 
 Kix – Midnite Dynamite (1985)
 Fiona – Beyond the Pale (1986)
 Alice Cooper – Trash (1989)
 Kane Roberts – Kane Roberts (1987)
 Twisted Sister – Love Is for Suckers (1987)
 Bob Dylan – Down in the Groove (1988)
 Various artists – Hearts of Fire soundtrack (1987)
 Blue Yonder – Blue Yonder (1987)
 Orange Swirl – Orange Swirl (1998)
 Seven Days – Ride (1998)
 Rob Eberhard Young – Speak (1999)
 Under Suspicion – Under Suspicion (2001)
 Jordan Rudess – Rhythm of Time (2004)
 Twenty Flight Rockers – The New York Sessions 1988 (2004)
 XCarnation – Grounded (2005)
 Jordan Rudess – The Road Home (2007)
 Northern Light Orchestra – Orchestra Arrangements (2009)
 Alice Cooper – Welcome 2 My Nightmare (2011)

Tributes 
 "Space Truckin'" – Smoke on the Water – A Tribute to Deep Purple (1994)
 "I'm in Love with My Car" – Stone Cold Queen: A Tribute (2001)
 "I Want You" – Spin the Bottle: An All-Star Tribute to Kiss (2004)
 "A Love Like Yours (Don't Come Knocking Everyday)" – What's Love? a Tribute to Tina Turner (2004)
 "Limelight" & "The Spirit of Radio" – Subdivisions: A Tribute to Rush (2005)
 "Send Her My Love" – An '80s Metal Tribute to Journey (2006)
 "Drive My Car" – Butchering the Beatles: A Headbashing Tribute (2006)
 "Holding Back the Years" (by Simply Red) – Hair Metal Greatest Power Ballad Covers (2009)

Videos/DVDs 
 Alice Cooper – The Nightmare Returns (1986)
 Winger – The Videos, Vol. 1 (1989)
 Winger – In the Heart of the Young, Vol. 1 (1990)
 Winger – In the Heart of the Young, Vol. 2 (1991)
 Winger – Live in Tokyo (1991)
 Winger – The Making of Pull (1993)
 Various artists – VH1 Metal Mania Stripped Across America Tour Live (2006)
 Winger – The Making of Winger IV (2007)
 Winger Live (2007)
 Winger DVD – Then & Now: The Making of Pull & Winger IV (2009)

Notes

References

Reviews and interviews 
 RockReport Review May 2008
 Metal Sludge Rewind with Kip Winger Retrieved on 2009-01-01.
 Kip Winger Interview October 2008
 Kip Winger-Interview November 2007
 Ghosts and Simpler Times by Mike Ward San Francisco Bay Times February 2010
 No Pride in Prejudice By Janos Gereben – Classical Voice February 2010
 rock star reinvents himself with the help of Blair professor Michael Kurek by Jim Patterson – Vanderbilt View June 2010
 Winger's True Passion: Music For Ballet by Amy Sciarretto October 2010

External links 

 

1961 births
Living people
American heavy metal bass guitarists
American male bass guitarists
Glam metal musicians
Alice Cooper (band) members
Winger (band) members
Musicians from Denver
Songwriters from Colorado
Progressive rock musicians
Progressive metal musicians
Guitarists from Colorado
20th-century American guitarists
20th-century American male singers
20th-century American singers
21st-century American guitarists
21st-century American male musicians
Frontiers Records artists
Domo Records artists
The Mob (American band) members